Development Research Center (DRC) of the State Council of China is a public institution responsible for policy research, strategic review and consulting of issues related to the economic and social development on mainland China.

It is an advisory body which recommends policies to CPC Central Committee and the State Council.

Organizational structure
The DRC is organized into the following departments.

Academic Committee
Committee for Assessment of Academic Qualifications
General Office (Personnel Bureau)
Department of International Cooperation
Department of Macroeconomic Research
Department of Development Strategy and Regional Economy
Department of Rural Economy
Department of Industrial Economy
Department of Foreign Economic Relations
Department of Social Development
Institute of Market Economy
Institute of Enterprise Research
Institute of Finance Research
Institute of Resources and Environment Policies
Institute of Public Administration and Human Resources
Information Center
Service Center
Center for International Knowledge on Development
China Development Research Foundation
Management World Magazine
China Economic Times
Almanac of China's Economy
China Development Observation
China Development Press
China Rural Labor Association
International Technology and Economy Institute
Euro-Asian Social Development Research Institute
Institute of World Development
Asia-Africa Development Research Institute
Ethnic Minority Groups Development Research Institute
Institute of Hong Kong and Macau Affairs

Prominent economists 
Xue Muqiao (1904–2005)
Ma Hong (1920–2007)
Fengbo Zhang (1957 - )
Wu Jinglian (1930 - )
Xie Fuzhan (born 1954)

References

External links 
Development Research Center Official Website
Development Research Center Information Network Website

Government agencies of China
Organizations based in Beijing
State Council of the People's Republic of China
Political and economic think tanks based in China
Foreign policy and strategy think tanks in China